Robert Hastings Hunkins (September 15, 1774 – March 11, 1853) was an American politician. He was an early settler of the Wisconsin territory and served in the Vermont House of Representatives.

Biography 
Hunkins was born in Vermont on September 15, 1774, the third son of Captain Robert Hunkins and his second wife, Lydia Chamberlin.

In 1806 Hunkins was both a selectman and treasurer for the town of Navy, Vermont. From 1811 to 1812 Hunkins was Town Representative to the Vermont General Assembly for the town of Charleston, Vermont. In 1811, the Vermont General Assembly was a unicameral legislature; in 1836, the Vermont Senate was added and the Vermont General Assembly became a bicameral legislature.

Three of Hunkins' sons, Sargeant, Robert and Benjamin, moved to the Wisconsin Territory. In 1839 Hunkins followed them and set up a large farm that he worked alongside his two other sons James and Hazen.

Hunkins died in New Berlin, Wisconsin in 1853. He was buried in the plot of his brother, the Hazen Hastings Hunkins plot, at Prairie Home Cemetery in Waukesha, Wisconsin.

Family 
On  November 15, 1798 Hunkins married Hannah, the daughter of Watts Emerson and Lois Trussel. They had five sons: 
 Sargeant Roger Hunkins (born March 12, 1802), who married Rebecca Whitcher (born September 6, 1807) on September 25, 1825;
 Robert W. Hunkins;
 Benjamin Hunkins, born 1810. Benjamin was called twice to service in the territorial legislature of Wisconsin. He was a delegate to the first constitutional convention of Wisconsin and served in the State Legislature in 1860; 
 James Hunkins;
 Hazen Hastings Hunkins
and some daughters, including:
 Carrie Arvilla Hunkins, who married Eugene W. Chafin.

References

External links 
 
 The Story of Hannah Duston

People from Orleans County, Vermont
People from New Berlin, Wisconsin
Members of the Vermont House of Representatives
1774 births
1853 deaths
Farmers from Wisconsin
People of pre-statehood Wisconsin